Michael John Churchill Campbell-Jones (21 January 1930 – 24 March 2020) was a Formula One driver from England. He participated in two World Championship Grands Prix, debuting on 17 June 1962. He scored no championship points. He also participated in numerous non-Championship Formula One races.

After some success in sports car racing in 1958, Campbell-Jones entered Formula Two whilst entering minor Formula One races. In 1962, he joined the Emeryson team but achieved little; his one World Championship entry was in the Belgian Grand Prix, where the Emeryson's gearbox failed in practice. He raced a borrowed Lotus which he retired with gearbox failure, although he was classified 11th. However, he did achieve some minor placings in lesser Formula One races that year. In the 1962 Solitude Grand Prix (non-championship) he had an accident in practice and was badly burnt.

In 1963, he moved to Tim Parnell's team which were running Lolas, but he struggled again with his single Championship entry seeing him finish 13th at the British Grand Prix. After that season, Campbell-Jones faded from the scene.

Complete Formula One World Championship results
(key)

References

1930 births
2020 deaths
English racing drivers
English Formula One drivers
Emeryson Formula One drivers
Reg Parnell Racing Formula One drivers
People from Leatherhead